The red-tailed shrike or Turkestan shrike (Lanius phoenicuroides) is a member of the shrike family (Laniidae). It was formerly considered conspecific with the isabelline shrike and the red-backed shrike.

Description
The plumage is a sandy colour. It has a red tail.

Range
The red-tailed shrike breeds in south Siberia and Central Asia.

Habits
This migratory medium-sized passerine eats large insects, small birds, rodents and lizards. Like other shrikes it hunts from prominent perches, and impales corpses on thorns or barbed wire as a larder. It breeds in open cultivated country, preferably with thorn bushes.

Gallery

References

External links
Oiseaux Pictures

red-tailed shrike
Birds of Central Asia
Birds of Africa
Birds of Western Asia
red-tailed shrike